Events from the year 1593 in India.

Events

Births
 6 April – Mumtaz Mahal, chief consort of Shah Jahan, (died 1631).

Deaths
 Appayya Dikshitar, performer of yajñas dies (born 1520)

See also
 Timeline of Indian history.

References